Crumenella is a genus of fungi in the family Helotiaceae.

References

Helotiaceae